Nritya, also referred to as Nritta, Nritta, Natana or Natya, refers to "dance, act on the stage, act, gesticulate, play" in the Indian traditions. It is sometimes sub-divided into two forms: nritta or pure dance, wherein expression-less movements of a dancer play out the rhythms and phrases of the music; and nritya or expressive dance, wherein the dancer includes facial expression and body language to portray mood and ideas with the rhythmic movements to communicate with the audience.

Nritya is broadly categorized as one of three parts of Sangita, the other two being gita (vocal music, song) and vadya (instrumental music). These ideas appear in the Vedic literature of Hinduism such as in the Aitareya Brahmana, and in early post-Vedic era Sanskrit texts such as the Natya Shastra, Panchatantra, Malvikagnimitra and Kathasaritsagara.

Nritya and Nata appears in Vedic era literature. For example, section 4.104 of Unadi Sutras mention Nata as "dancer, mime, actor". Panini too mentions the terms Nritya and Nartaka respectively as dance and dancer, in his treatise on Sanskrit grammar.

The term Nritya appears in all major classical Indian dance forms as one form of their repertoire, inspired by the guidelines of the Natya Shastra. These are Nritta, Nritya and Natya:

The Nritta performance is an abstract, fast and rhythmic aspect of the dance. The dancer performs pure dance steps by using adavu. In simple words, we can say that Nritta means pure classical dance.
The Nritya is a slower and significant aspect of the dance that attempts to communicate feelings, storyline particularly with spiritual themes in Hindu dance traditions. In a nritya, the dance-acting expands to include silent expression of words through gestures and body motion set to musical notes. The actor articulates a legend or a spiritual message. This part of the repertoire is more than sensory enjoyment, and it aims to engage the emotions and mind of the viewer.
The Natyam is a play, typically a team performance, but can be acted out by a solo performer where the dancer uses certain standardized body movements to indicate a new character in the underlying story. A Natyam incorporates the elements of a Nritya.

See also
Indian classical dance
Natya shastra
Sangita Ratnakara

References

Bibliography 
 

 
 
 

, Table of Contents

Hindu texts
Theatre in India
Musical theatre
Sanskrit texts
Cultural history of India